Rhodri Jones is a Welsh documentary photographer based in Bologna, Italy. He has exhibited widely and has published several volumes of photography. His work has been carried by the Panos Pictures photographic agency since 1992.

Biography 
Jones was born in Tregarth, Gwynedd, North Wales. His mother is from Luxembourg, his father is Welsh, so he grew up influenced by three languages; English, Welsh and German.

Since 1989 he has travelled widely, producing images from locations such as China, Albania and Wales. He has produced several volumes of personal work as well as commissioned work. He was described by fellow Welsh born photojournalist, Philip Jones Griffiths as "a Welsh poet with a camera"

Publications 
Albania. An Oxfam Country Profile. Oxfam, 2000. . Text by Neil Olsen.
Made in China. Modena: Logos Art, 2002. . Texts by Philip Jones Griffiths and Hong Ying.
Return/Yn ôl. Bridgend, Wales: Seren, 2006. . Foreword by Gwyneth Lewis.
Hinterland. Italy: L’artiere edizionitalia, 2010. . With a transcript of a conversation between Jones  and Gianni Celati.
Scambi ferroviari: l'azzurro del servizio ferroviario nel paesaggio bolognese. Bologna: L’artiere edizionitalia, 2011. .
So Be It. Italy: L’artiere, 2015. . With poems by Martin Camaj, introductions by Leonard Fox and Monica Dematté and a text by Jones.

Exhibitions 
Made in China
2002, Turner House Gallery, National Museum Wales, Cardiff, Wales.
2003, Noorderlicht Photofestival, Groningen, Netherlands;
2003  Spitz Gallery London.
2003 Rome International Photo Festival.
2003 Pingyao Photography Festival.
2007 "Visioni di Cina", Centro Culturale Trevi, Bolzano, Italy.
Return / Yn Ôl
2006, National Library of Wales, Aberystwyth, Wales; Cynon Valley Museum and Gallery, Aberdare, Wales; Oriel Ynys Môn, Anglesey, Wales. Reduced versions of this show toured throughout Wales (2006–09).
Go: Internal Migration in China
2008, Side Gallery, Newcastle upon Tyne, England. During the show large posters, sponsored by the Look East festival, were shown on advertising billboards around the city.
2008, Cynon Valley Museum and Gallery, Aberdare, Wales.
Land of the Living Past
2008, Lighthouse Media Centre, Wolverhampton, England.
2009, Aberystwyth Arts Centre, Wales, UK.
2010, Galleria 41ZERO30, Bomporto, Italy.
2015, Mo Art space, Xinmi, Henan Province, China.
Hinterland
2010 Urban Centre, Sala Borsa, Bologna.
2012, Museum of Farming Culture, Bentivoglio, Bologna, Italy.
2012, Photomonth Festival, Italian Institute of Culture, Kraków, Poland.
2012, Galleria Pubblica, Castel Maggiore, Italy.

Notes

References

External links 
Rhodri Jones's website
Photographs by Jones, Panos Pictures.

1963 births
Photography in Wales
Photography in China
Documentary photographers
Welsh photographers
People from Gwynedd
British emigrants to Italy
Photography in Italy
Living people